Roy Thomas Harris, GC (1 August 1902 – 18 August 1973) was an Air Raid Precautions officer who was awarded the George Cross for the "conspicuous gallantry" he displayed in defusing unexploded bombs that had fallen on Langdale Road in Thornton Heath, Surrey, during the Second World War.

He later joined the Royal Engineers where he reached the rank of Hon. Major.

George Cross
While working as the Chief Combustion Engineer to Croydon Corporation, Harris was serving as a captain in The Queen's Royal Regiment, attached to the Croydon Home Guard.

On the night of 17/18 September, a Luftwaffe bombing raid had resulted in a number of unexploded devices being found at a school on Langdale Road in Thornton Heath, Surrey. Harris proceeded to the school to defuse the bombs and save the school from certain destruction.

Harris's George Cross citation appeared in the London Gazette on 17 December 1940:

References

Further reading
 Hissey, Terry – Come if ye Dare – The Civil Defence George Crosses, (2008), Civil Defence Assn

1902 births
1973 deaths
British recipients of the George Cross
Queen's Royal Regiment officers
Royal Engineers officers
British Army personnel of World War II
Military personnel from Cardiff
Bomb disposal personnel